The Sheats–Goldstein Residence is a home designed and built between 1961 and 1963 by American architect John Lautner in the Beverly Crest neighborhood in Los Angeles, California, a short distance up the hill from the Beverly Hills city limit. The building was conceived from the inside out and built into the sandstone ledge of the hillside; a cave-like dwelling that opens to embrace nature and view.  The house is an example of American Organic Architecture that derives its form as an extension of the natural environment and of the individual for whom it was built. Typical of Lautner's work, the project was approached from an idea and a structure was derived that addressed the challenges of the site.

History

The home was originally built for Helen and Paul Sheats and their three children. Helen, an artist, and Paul, a university professor, had previously commissioned Lautner for the 1948–1949 Sheats Apartments project located in Westwood adjacent to the University of California, Los Angeles.

There were two subsequent owners before a businessman, James Goldstein, purchased the residence in 1972, in a state of some disrepair. No walls existed in the living room, and a device meant to heat the house often did not work well. Goldstein commissioned John Lautner to work on the transformation of the house; a series of remodelings that would encompass the entire house over a period of more than two decades. Goldstein worked with Lautner until the architect's death in 1994 on what they called "perfecting" the house.

The Sheats–Goldstein Residence is one of the best known examples of John Lautner's work; he designed not only the house, but the interiors, windows, lighting, rugs, furniture, and operable features. The house is extensively detailed, and the range of the architect's work is visible through the different stages of the re-mastering. All of the furnishings enhance the house and are completely related so that the aesthetic of the forms is a function of the whole.

The original construction of the house is poured-in-place concrete, steel, and wood. The home was built with five bedrooms, four and a half baths, and a living room that was originally completely open to the terrace, protected by only a curtain of forced air. The living room features open space that carries the interior into the outdoors blurring the line between the interior and exterior. The expansive coffered ceiling living room is pierced by drinking glass skylights in the coffers (750 skylights in all). The home uses cross ventilation for cooling; there is no air conditioning. The floors are radiant heated with copper pipes that also warm the pool. Exterior covered pathways lead to the guest bedrooms and the master bedroom, and outside features include a tennis court and night club.

Lautner opened these spaces because of the temperate climate that Southern California offers most of the year. Pool windows in the master bedroom were also an original feature that allowed Helen Sheats to watch her children as she worked in her studio below the pool.

The skyspace, also called Above Horizon, is an art installation located on a steep slope below the residence. The skyspace was designed by light artist James Turrell. The project is built in the same construction materials as the home. James Goldstein originally conceived this art installation as a collaboration between John Lautner and James Turrell. However, Lautner died before being able to work extensively on the project. Completed in 2004, the room features two portals, made by a local aerospace engineer, which fold away using carbon fiber composite materials. The room also contains a built-in concrete lounge to enjoy the thousands of hidden LEDs that flood the room every evening for the sky and light show.

In 2016, the Los Angeles County Museum of Art (LACMA) announced that James Goldstein has entrusted the home and its surrounding estate in a promised gift to the institution. The future endowment includes the home's extensive art collection, original architectural models, and a 1961 Rolls-Royce Silver Cloud which resides on the property. The first collection of its kind for LACMA, the endowment seeks to preserve the legacy of the home and Lautner's work, as well as its significance in Los Angeles architecture history.

In popular culture
The home has been featured in movies such as Charlie's Angels: Full Throttle, The Big Lebowski, and Bandits, as well on television in Southland and Possessions (1997) by Andrew Blake. The home is also prominently featured during the first season of Snowfall on FX. The rapper Doja Cat filmed the music video for her song "Say So" from Hot Pink inside and on the patio of the home, and rapper Nelly shot the majority of his music video for his song "The Fix" featuring Jeremih at the location in 2015. The opening shot of R&B singer Tracie Spencer's "It's All About You (Not About Me) was filmed at the residence. The residence appears throughout Grapevyne by the R&B group Brownstone. Snoop Dogg and Pharrell's single 'Let's get blown' was also shot at location in 2005. The home is featured in the 2002 music video for "Forgive" by country artist Rebecca Lynn Howard. Actor Carel Struycken photographed the home's living room in his collection of spherical panoramas.

Citations

General sources

External links
 Official John Lautner website
 Architect Duncan Nicholson's web site
 James Goldstein's web site
 "Lautner, Schindler, Wright, and I" by Katya Tylevich; MARK No. 22

Houses in Los Angeles County, California
Houses completed in 1963
John Lautner buildings
Los Angeles County Museum of Art
Modernist architecture in California